Loneliness Is Bliss is an EP by Arthur, a side project of MxPx. It was released on November 30, 1999 on Rock City Recording Company, a label owned and operated by MxPx.

Track listing
All songs written by Mike Herrera and arranged by Arthur.

 "Thought a Lot"
 "Self Evaluation"
 "Birthday Party"
 "Friday, April 6th"
 "All My Life"
 "Amazingly True"

Personnel
Mike Herrera (listed as Arthur) – guitar, vocals
Tom Wisniewski (listed as Edmund) – guitar
Neil Hundt (listed as Alexander) – bass
Yuri Ruley (listed as Zane) – drums
Steve Kravac – recording, mixing
Andrea Jennings – equip photos, layout

1999 EPs